Propheteer or propheteering can mean:

Propheteering, the practice of claiming to be a prophet in order to make money
Propheteer, a player of prediction games
Max Apple's novel The Propheteers
The Propheteers, a musical group based in Asheville, North Carolina
Propheteer, a post-hardcore band based in Great Falls, Montana, USA.

See also
Profiteer